New Livingstone Stadium was a proposed multi-purpose stadium in Livingstone, Zambia, that was in the planning stages until Zambia backed out of hosting the 2011 All-Africa Games in 2009.  It would have been used mostly for football matches and hosted some events for the 2011 All-Africa Games. The stadium would have hada capacity of 50,000 people.  It was to be built along with new stadiums in Ndola and Lusaka.

External links
Plans for new stadium announced
More plans for stadium

Football venues in Zambia
Unbuilt stadiums
Multi-purpose stadiums in Zambia
Livingstone, Zambia
Proposed buildings and structures in Zambia